Buenos Aires 8 was an Argentine vocal ensemble which specialised in recording tango classics such as music by Ástor Piazzolla.

Personnel
 Chichita Fanelli
 Magdalena León (Ani Grunwald, in an earlier formation)
 Laura Hatton (Analía Lovato, in an earlier formation)
 Clara Steinberg
 Miguel Odiard
 Guli Tolaba
 Horacio Corral
 Fernando Llosa

Discography

Studio albums
 Tangos (1973)
 Timeless (1990)
 Folklore (unknown)

External links

Buenos Aires 8
Buenos Aires 8
Argentina, Buenos Aires 8
Musical groups from Buenos Aires